Kamb may refer to:
 Kamb, Southern Highlands Province, a village in Papua-New Guinea
 Kamb, Western Finland Province, Finland
 Kamb, Louga, Senegal
 Kamb, on the Cap-Vert peninsula in Senegal

KAMB may refer to:

 KAMB (FM), a radio station (101.5 FM) licensed to serve Merced, California
 16S rRNA (adenine1408-N1)-methyltransferase, an enzyme